Nedine subspinosa is a species of beetle in the family Cerambycidae. It was described by Wang and Chiang in 1999.

References

Desmiphorini
Beetles described in 1999